An oxalate degrading enzyme is a type of enzyme that catalyzes the biodegradation of oxalate. Enzymes in this class include oxalate oxidase, oxalate decarboxylase, oxalyl-CoA decarboxylase, and formyl-CoA transferase.

Specific enzymes
Oxalate oxidase （Enzyme Commission number ）occurs mainly in plants.  It can degrade oxalic acid into carbon dioxide and hydrogen peroxide.

Oxalate decarboxylase (OXDC，) is a kind of oxalate degrading enzyme containing Mn2+, found mainly in fungi or some bacteria.  Brown rot fungi secrete oxalate to break down cellulose fibers of wood, but deploy this enzyme to permit regulatory control over the total quantity of oxalate present. It can appear in the absence of other cofactors under the action of the degradation of oxalic acid directly to form formic acid and CO2.

Oxalyl-CoA decarboxylase（）mainly mediates degradation of bacterial oxalic acid.

Formyl-CoA transferase （）mediates the exchange of oxalyl and formyl groups on coenzyme A, interconverting formyl-CoA and oxalyl-CoA.

Calcium oxalate stones and oxalate degrading enzymes
Calcium oxalate is the main component of the most common type of kidney stone in humans.

References

Oxalates
Enzymes